Mother Nature's Kitchen is the debut album from the Scottish singer/songwriter Kevin McDermott with his band Kevin McDermott Orchestra.

History 

Following his solo album, Suffocation Blues, Kevin McDermott formed the Kevin McDermott Orchestra/KMO, with an initial line-up of Jim McDermott on drums, Steph Greer on bass, and Chris Bramble on percussion. They started performing the material that would become Mother Nature's Kitchen. 

McDermott distributed KMO demos to record companies, the recordings now without Bramble, and with Iain Harvie, and they were soon signed to Island Records. 

In 1989, KMO recorded Mother Nature’s Kitchen. The line-up for the album recording was Jim McDermott, Steph Greer, Robbie McIntosh, Blair Cowan, and David Crichton. Shortly after the recording was completed, Robbie McIntosh left to play for Paul McCartney, and Marco Rossi joined KMO on electric lead guitar.

In July 2022, the remastered Last Night From Glasgow release of Mother Nature’s Kitchen reached number ten in the Official Scottish Albums Chart Top 100.

Track listing
All songs written by Kevin McDermott.

 Wheels Of Wonder – 4:45
 Slow Boat to Something Better – 3:54
 King of Nothing – 4:18
 Diamond – 3:20
 Mother Nature's Kitchen – 4:47
 Into the Blue – 3:40
 Where We Were Meant To Be – 4:00
 Statue to A Stone – 3:54
 What Comes To Pass – 3:28
 Suffocation Blues – 1:51
 Angel – 4:32
 Healing At The Harbour – 4:37

Personnel
Musicians
Kevin McDermott: Vocals and Rhythm Guitar 
Robbie McIntosh: Electric Lead Guitar 
Jim McDermott: Drums and Percussion 
Stephen Greer: Electric Bass Guitar and Backing Vocals 
Blair Cowan: Keyboards 
David Crichton: Fiddle
Technical personnel
Engineered by Kenny MacDonald, assisted by David Bowie
Cover photograph by David Hiscock

References 

1989 albums